Elegy is the third studio album by Finnish metal band Amorphis. It is their first to feature a majority of clean vocals, sung by new vocalist Pasi Koskinen. This also marks the first album with drummer Pekka Kasari who replaced Jan Rechberger and the only album with keyboardist Kim Rantala. The music and lyrics are inspired by the traditional Finnish ballads and poems compiled in the Kanteletar by Elias Lönnrot in 1840.

The primary genre of the album is progressive metal, with strong folk influence, as well as elements of melodic death metal and heavy metal. Many of the album's tracks, e.g. "Against Widows", have become fan favorites and have been performed in concerts since Elegy'''s release.

In 2004, Relapse Records reissued Elegy as a digipak, featuring four live bonus tracks. The songs "Against Widows", "On Rich and Poor", "My Kantele", and "Song of the Troubled One" were all re-recorded on Magic & Mayhem – Tales from the Early Years. "My Kantele" was covered on Live & Acoustic'' by Thurisaz.

Track listing

Bonus CDs

Notes 
 Songs recorded live at Ilosaarirock, Finland, on 12 July 1997.

Personnel

Amorphis
Pasi Koskinen – clean/lead vocals (1–6, 8, 9, 11), occasional growling (2, 6)
Esa Holopainen – lead guitar
Tomi Koivusaari – rhythm guitar, co-vocal/death growl (1, 2, 4–9); tambourine
Olli-Pekka Laine – bass
Kim Rantala – keyboards
Pekka Kasari – drums

Additional personnel
 Mixed at Parr Street Studios, Liverpool, England 
 Engineer: Pete Coleman
 Assistant engineer: Dave Buchanan
 Mastered by Dave Shirk at SAE Mastering
 Produced by Amorphis and Hiili Hiilesmaa. 
 Executive producers: William J. Yurkiewicz Jr. and Matthew F. Jacobson
 Cover art: Kristian Wahlin

References

Amorphis albums
1996 albums
Relapse Records albums
Albums with cover art by Kristian Wåhlin